Halldor Skard (born 11 April 1973 in Oslo) is a former Norwegian nordic combined skier who competed from 1990 to 2000. He won the 4 x 5 km team Event at the 1998 Winter Olympics in Nagano. Skard also won two medals in the 4 x 5 km team Event at the FIS Nordic World Ski Championships with a gold in 1997 and a silver in 1995.

External links
 
 

1973 births
Living people
Norwegian male Nordic combined skiers
Nordic combined skiers at the 1998 Winter Olympics
Olympic gold medalists for Norway
Skiers from Oslo
Olympic medalists in Nordic combined
FIS Nordic World Ski Championships medalists in Nordic combined
Medalists at the 1998 Winter Olympics
20th-century Norwegian people